Superdude is an Indian reality TV show on UTV Bindaas,  featuring male contestants who perform a series of tasks, mostly with females to impress them and the judges. Every week, one contestant who impresses the judges the least gets eliminated from the show.

The second season went on air on TV October 27, 2012 with 13 contestants. The show is hosted and judged by the actor, Ashmit Patel and also by singer-actor Sofia Hayat, and is also co-hosted by the television personality Madhura Naik. The contestants live in a custom made house called Dude Mansion and are given dating tips by Ashmit Patel for their performances.

Contestant Paras Zutshi won the title the second season.

References 

Bindass original programming
Indian reality television series
2011 Indian television series debuts
2012 Indian television series endings